Limnonectes mawlyndipi is a species of frog in the family Dicroglossidae.
It is endemic to India.
Its natural habitats are subtropical or tropical moist montane forest, rivers, freshwater marshes, and intermittent freshwater marshes. Its status is insufficiently known.

References

mawlyndipi
Frogs of India
Taxonomy articles created by Polbot
Amphibians described in 1990